Baker Memorial Church was a Methodist church in Concord, New Hampshire, United States. It organized on October 30, 1874, by Presiding Elder Theodore L. Flood, in response to a request from 100 members of the First Church, who believed the best interests of a growing Methodism could be served best with two societies instead of one. 

The church was named in honor of Bishop Osmon C. Baker, a native of New Hampshire and a member of the New Hampshire Annual Conference. It was later demolished.

References

Buildings and structures in Concord, New Hampshire
Churches in Merrimack County, New Hampshire
Religious organizations established in 1874
1874 establishments in New Hampshire